Holy Spirit plays a key role in the Acts of the Apostles, leading to the use of the titles "Book of the Holy Spirit" or the "Acts of the Holy Spirit" for that book in the New Testament. Acts is written by Luke who also wrote the gospel after his name. Acts tells the story of the birth of the early church when the apostles met in the Upper Room in Jerusalem. Of the about seventy occurrences of the word pneuma in Acts, fifty-five refer to the Holy Spirit.

Continuation of the ministry of Jesus
From the start, in Acts 1:2, the reader is reminded that the Ministry of Jesus, while he was on Earth, was carried out through the power of the Holy Spirit and that the "acts of the apostles" are the continuing acts of Jesus, facilitated by the Holy Spirit. Acts thus presents the Holy Spirit as the "life principle" of the early church and provides five separate and dramatic instances of its outpouring on believers: Acts 2:1–4, Acts 4:28–31, Acts 8:15–7, Acts 10:44 and Acts 19:6.

Continuous work
References to the Holy Spirit appear throughout Acts 1:5 and 8, stating towards the beginning: "For John indeed baptized with water; but ye shall be baptized in the Holy Spirit… ye shall receive power, when the Holy Spirit is come upon you" referring to the fulfillment of the prophecy of John the Baptist in Luke 3:16: "he shall baptize you in the Holy Spirit."

In addition to the Holy Spirit and in its impacts on the Book of Acts, this should include the Lord's direct communication to Paul the Apostle. This encounter had a very pivotal in terms of Paul's defense against the Roman Empire and Jewish authority empowered by the Holy Spirit. Several passages, for example, Acts 9:1–9, Acts 18:10, Acts 23:11, and Acts 27:23 all reveal a pneumatological element that reshapes the outcome of Paul's trial bending towards the prevailing of God's will rather than the agony of Paul's death.

References

Holy Spirit
People in Acts of the Apostles